Provoking Laughter is a 2016 Chinese  adventure crime comedy film directed by Tang Xu and starring Pan Yueming, Wu Yue, Chang Yuan, Archie Kao, Tan Kai and Lin Peng. It was released in China by Dadi Century Films Distribution on 29 December 2016.

Plot

Cast
Pan Yueming
Wu Yue
Chang Yuan
Archie Kao
Tan Kai
Lin Peng
Chin Shih-chieh

Reception
The film has grossed  in China.

References

Chinese comedy films
Chinese crime films
Chinese crime comedy films
2010s crime comedy films
2010s adventure films
2016 comedy films